Alexei Dmitriyevich Krasnozhon (born April 11, 2000) is a Russian-American former competitive figure skater. Competing for the United States, he is the 2017 CS Tallinn Trophy silver medalist, 2017 Junior Grand Prix Final champion, and 2017 U.S. national junior champion. Krasnozhon skated for Russia earlier in his career, making his last international appearance in December 2013.

Personal life 
Krasnozhon was born on April 11, 2000, in Saint Petersburg, Russia. His mother, Natalia, is an endocrinologist and his father, Dmitri, is an oncologist. He has two younger sisters, named Dana and Sofia. 
In 2014, Krasnozhon moved to Dallas, Texas. While training in Texas, he lived with his coaches, Peter and Darlene Cain, for five years. He later moved to live on his own in Plano, where his parents often visited. After relocating with coaches Olga Ganicheva and Alexei Letov to Boston, Kranoszhon roomed with fellow skaters Jimmy Ma and Misha Mitrofanov in Norwood. 

In March 2018, Krasnozhon said that he planned to apply for U.S. citizenship and applied as an alien of extraordinary ability after turning 18. He received his green card in September 2020. Krasnozhon retired prior to the 2021–22 season, as he noted he would have been unable to gain citizenship in time for the 2022 Winter Olympics. Although he originally planned to retire after the Olympics in January 2022, he acknowledged that it would have been difficult for him to make the team regardless of his citizenship and chose to retire earlier and instead pursue a college degree.

While skating, Krasnozhon enrolled in a private online high school and expressed interest in a business degree from Georgetown University or Southern Methodist University. In his May 2021 retirement announcement, he shared that he would be attending Texas Christian University's John V. Roach Honors College. Krasnozhon has expressed interest in becoming an immigration lawyer, as he was thankful for the opportunities afforded to him and his family by moving to the United States.

Career

In Russia 
Krasnozhon began skating as a five-year-old. At age seven, he became a student of Alexei Mishin, as well as his wife Tatiana Mishina and their assistant coach Oleg Tataurov. He competed for Russia at the Volvo Open Cup in January 2013, winning gold on the advanced novice level, and placed twelfth at the 2013 Russian Junior Championships.

Krasnozhon won the junior silver medal at the Denkova-Staviski Cup in December 2013. He missed much of the season due to a back injury.

Switch to the United States 
In March 2014, Krasnozhon announced that he planned to compete for the United States and would be coached by Peter Cain and Darlene Cain in Euless, Texas. He qualified for the 2015 US Championships on the junior level and won the pewter medal.

On July 1, 2015, the Russian Figure Skating Federation released Krasnozhon so that he could compete internationally for the United States. While training in Moscow, Krasnozhon performed full run-throughs of his programs about once a week, but he began doing them daily after moving to Texas.

2015–2016 season 
Making his Junior Grand Prix (JGP) debut, Krasnozhon won the bronze medal in August 2015 in Riga, Latvia. He then placed fifth in Torun, Poland. After receiving the junior gold medal at the Midwestern Sectionals, he closed his season by winning the junior bronze medal at the 2016 U.S. Championships, finishing behind Tomoki Hiwatashi and Kevin Shum.

2016–2017 season 
Competing in the 2016 JGP series, Krasnozhon won silver in Ostrava, Czech Republic, and then gold in Ljubljana, Slovenia. He qualified to the Junior Grand Prix Final in Marseille, France, where he finished fifth. At the 2017 U.S. Championships, he won the junior men's title. He qualified to the free skate at the 2017 World Junior Championships in Taipei, Taiwan.

2017–2018 season 
Making his senior international debut, Krasnozhon placed fourth at the Philadelphia Summer International in early August 2017. Competing in the Junior Grand Prix series, Krasnozhon won gold medals in Brisbane, Australia, and Zagreb, Croatia, which qualified him for the Final for a second time.  Competing at his first Challenger event, and he won a silver medal at the 2017 CS Tallinn Trophy.  Krasnozhon then won gold at the Junior Grand Prix Final in Nagoya, Japan.  He outscored the silver medalist, Camden Pulkinen, by more than 19 points and set a new personal best total score, 236.35 points, at the competition.

Krasnozhon competed in the senior ranks at the 2018 U.S. Championships, placing eighth in the short program, thirteenth in the free skate, and tenth overall. In March, he placed first in the short program at the 2018 World Junior Championships in Sofia, Bulgaria. While attempting a quad salchow during his free skate, he sustained a Grade 2 sprain of all three major ligaments in his right ankle, causing him to withdraw.

Krasnozhon changed coaches during the off-season, deciding to train under Olga Ganicheva and Alexei Letov at the Dr. Pepper Starcenter in Plano, Texas.

2018–2019 season 
Krasnozhon started his season off at the 2018 CS Nebelhorn Trophy, where he placed fifth overall. Krasnozhon was invited to two senior Grand Prix events, the 2018 Grand Prix of Helsinki and 2018 Rostelecom Cup. Making his Grand Prix debut, Krasnozhon placed sixth at the Grand Prix of Helsinki and eighth at the Rostelecom Cup. Krasnozhon withdrew from the 2018 CS Golden Spin of Zagreb in December 2018.

At the 2019 U.S. Championships, Krasnozhon placed fifth.  Assigned to compete at the 2019 World Junior Championships, he placed fifth in the short program, making a minor error on his Lutz-loop combination. In March 2019, he won gold medal at the Egna Spring Trophy.

2019–2020 season 
In early August, Krasnozhon received the bronze medal at the Philadelphia Summer International.  Krasnozhon next placed fourth at the 2019 CS U.S. Classic.  In the free skate, he landed the quad loop for the first time. At his first Grand Prix of the year, 2019 Skate America, he placed tenth in the short program after underrotating and falling on an attempted quad flip, a new jump for him.  In the free skate, he had a "hard, painful" fall on his quad flip attempt, but executed the rest of his planned triple jumps successfully, and rose to ninth place overall.  He was tenth at the 2019 Rostelecom Cup. three week later he finished ninth at the 2019 CS Golden Spin of Zagreb.

Competing at the 2020 U.S. Championships, Krasnozhon placed sixth in the short program, attempting only triple jumps.  In the free skate he underrotated an attempted quad loop and put a hand down on a triple Axel, but remained in sixth place.

2020–2021 season 
With the coronavirus pandemic raging, the ISU chose to assign the Grand Prix based largely on training location, leading to Krasnozhon attending the 2020 Skate America.  Krasnozhon landed another quad loop in the short program, placing fifth, but struggled in the free skate and fell to seventh place overall.

Krasnozhon competed at the 2021 U.S. Championships, placing sixteenth out of seventeen skaters in the short program after falling on every jump. He rallied in the free skate, placing seventh in that segment, rising to eleventh place overall.

On May 12th, he announced his retirement from competitive skating, saying that he would be attending Texas Christian University starting in the Fall of 2021.

Programs

Competitive highlights 

GP: Grand Prix; CS: Challenger Series; JGP: ISU Junior Grand Prix

For the United States

For Russia

Detailed results 
Small medals for short and free programs awarded only at ISU Championships. ISU Personal best highlighted in bold.

Senior results

Junior results

References

External links
 

2000 births
Living people
American male single skaters
Russian male single skaters
Figure skaters from Saint Petersburg
Russian emigrants to the United States